Redondo Junction, California is the site of an Amtrak maintenance facility.

Redondo Junction services Amtrak's long distance trains: Southwest Chief, Coast Starlight, Sunset Limited and Texas Eagle, and the regional train the Pacific Surfliner.

History

The California Central Railway built and ran a 13-mile line from Port Ballona (what is now Playa del Rey, Los Angeles) to Redondo Junction. The line opened in September 1887. Redondo Junction became a major train maintenance facility. The California Central Railway ran a line from Redondo Junction to Los Angeles-La Grande Station.  

The Redondo Beach Railway also connected to Redondo Junction. The Redondo Beach Railway was incorporated in April 1888, Henry E. Huntington controlled and owned much of the Redondo Beach Railway. The Redondo Beach Railway line started operations on September 1, 1888. The California Central Railway operated on, but did not own the Railway. This line ran  from Redondo Beach to Inglewood, California. 

In 1890, the Hotel Redondo opened. The rail line helped make Redondo "the place" for tourists. The first train ran on April 16, 1888, from Inglewood to downtown Los Angeles on California Central Railway tracks through Redondo Junction.

The California Central Railway completed a line started by the San Bernardino and San Diego Railway. The line ran from Redondo Junction to Orange and continued to Anaheim, San Juan Capistrano and then to Oceanside and San Diego. The Pacific Surfliner still runs on this line from San Diego to Santa Ana.

On November 7, 1889, California Central Railway was consolidated into the Southern California Railway Company. On June 30, 1888, it started operations as a subsidiary of the Atchison, Topeka and Santa Fe Railway. In 1914 Santa Fe built a 25-track roundhouse there to service trains. The railway turntable was a  through plate girder design.

The Redondo Junction train wreck came on January 22, 1956. It was a deadly wreck involving the Santa Fe RDCs. It was the first major disaster in the Los Angeles area covered on live television, and the worst train wreck in the city's history. The train comprised two RDCs (Budd Rail Diesel Cars) which ran two return trips daily on the San Diegan (train numbers 80-83) between the more conventional streamliners. The RDCs overturned on a sharp curve near the tower, killing 30 and injuring 117.

Redondo Junction was sold to Amtrak in January 1977. In May 1999, Amtrak built new facilities just north of the 1914 roundhouse. The 1914 roundhouse was demolished in August 2000 to make space for a future servicing area. The railway turntable is still on the site.

Redondo Junction project

In 2002 the Redondo Junction project was completed. The project separates passenger rail from freight rail by elevating Amtrak and Metrolink railroad lines over the Alameda Corridor in Los Angeles at Redondo Junction.

See also
Junction (rail)
List of California railroads
History of rail transportation in California
Southern Transcon
Pacific Electric's Red Cars that connected with the rail lines.
 Venice–Inglewood Line
Santa Fe 3751
David B. Jones Special
Beach Cities Greenway on old Redondo Branch

References

Sources
ICC Report No.3675
Santa Fe Budd RDC-1 DC-191 preserved
 Railroads of San Bernardino County, California
California Southern Railway History

Rail transportation in California
Rail yards in the United States
South Los Angeles
Transportation in Los Angeles
Amtrak facilities
Atchison, Topeka and Santa Fe Railway